Radhika Kumaraswamy (born 1 November 1986), credited as Radhika and as Kutty Radhika in Tamil films, is an Indian actress. She has primarily appeared in Kannada films.

Career

Radhika started her acting career with the Kannada film Neela Megha Shama (2002) when she had just completed her ninth class. Her first release was Ninagagi, opposite Vijay Raghavendra, which was followed by Tavarige Baa Tangi, starring Shivrajkumar; both films were highly successful ventures. In 2003, she appeared in five Kannada films, including Hemanth Hegde's directorial debut Ooh La La; Hudugigaagi, alongside S. P. B. Charan; Yograj Bhat's maiden feature film Mani, in which she played the daughter of a prostitute; Mane Magalu and Tayi Illada Tabbali, all of which were commercial failures. In spite of the film's poor box office returns, Radhika's performance as Gowri in Tayi Illada Tabbali won her the Karnataka State Film Award for Best Actress.

Radhika subsequently began to work in Tamil cinema, acting in four Tamil films and one Telugu film (Bhadadri Ramudu) in quick succession. Her debut Tamil film was S. P. Jananathan's award-winning debut directorial Iyarkai (2003). The Hindu in its review noted that Kutty Radhika as the "impulsive, immature and obdurate Nancy looks just right for the role". Three of her four releases in 2005—Rishi, Masala and Auto Shankar—featured her alongside another lead female character. Again in 2005 she appeared in  Anna Thangi  collaborating with the Tavarige Baa Tangi team, Shivrajkumar and Radhika again playing the elder brother and younger sister roles, respectively.

The following year, she was again seen in five Kannada films and one Tamil film Ulla Kadathal, that remains her last Tamil release. On her performance in Hatavadi, Rediff.com's critic R. G. Vijayasarathy wrote: "Though this is essentially a Ravichandran film, it is to Radhika's credit that she stands up to a superb performance. Her emotions are perfect and she is presented very well on screen". After the long-delayed devotional film Navashakthi Vaibhava (2008), that featured her as a goddess alongside eight other lead actresses she went on a 5-year hiatus.

Radhika has also worked as a film distributor and producer. She has acquired the distribution rights of her own film Anatharu (2007), co-starring Upendra and Darshan. In 2008, she bought the rights of her film Ishwar, which was launched in 2007 as Narasimha, and revived it, although she was unsuccessful in releasing it. She later established a production studio named Shamika Enterprises, named after her daughter, and produced the film Lucky, starring Ramya and Yash.

In 2013, she made a comeback to acting with Sweety Nanna Jodi which she also produced. With regards to her performance, Sify stated: "Radhika...is a treat to watch and has given a brilliant performance" while Rediff wrote: "Radhika looks ravishing and comes as a surprise for those who have watched her earlier films". Her Telugu mythological film Avataram, by Kodi Ramakrishna released in 2014.

Personal life
Born in Tulu speaking family, Radhika reportedly married Ratan Kumar at the Sri Durga Parameshwari Temple, Kateel on 26 November 2000. In April 2002, Ratan Kumar filed a complaint, alleging that Radhika's father Devraj had abducted her as he feared that news of her marriage may "jeopardise her career". Only a few days later, Radhika's mother wanted the marriage to be annulled as Radhika was just 13 1/2 years old and said that Ratan Kumar had forcibly married her. Devraj further claimed that Ratan had tried to burn Radhika alive. Ratan Kumar died in August 2002, following a heart attack.

In November 2010, Radhika revealed that she was married to H.D.Kumaraswamy, former chief Minister of Karnataka. According to Radhika, they married in 2006 and have a daughter named Shamika.

Filmography

Television

As Producer

References

External links
 

Actresses from Mangalore
Tulu people
Indian film actresses
Actresses in Kannada cinema
Living people
Actresses in Tamil cinema
1986 births
21st-century Indian actresses
Film producers from Karnataka
Indian women film producers
Kannada film producers
Actresses in Telugu cinema
Businesswomen from Karnataka
Businesspeople from Mangalore
Spouses of Indian politicians